The Ipswich and Stowmarket Navigation Act 1790 was an Act of Parliament to facilitate the development of the River Gipping to make it navigable from Stowmarket to Ipswich.

Parliament had been petitioned in 1719 to make the River Gipping navigable, but this had been opposed by Ipswich Corporation, fearing that such a development would have a negative impact on their vested interests. However, following advances in civil engineering during the eighteenth century, the 1790 bill was passed. The Act set up the Stowmarket Navigation Trust.

Ipswich and Stowmarket Navigation Act 1793
After a protracted lawsuit, the Stowmarket Navigation Trust needed to raise a further £15,000 which was enabled by the Ipswich and Stowmarket Navigation Act 1793 (33 Geo. 3. c. 20).

References

Great Britain Acts of Parliament 1790
River Gipping